Jamie Nicholls (born October 15, 1971) is a Canadian social democrat and politician. He was a New Democratic Party Member of Parliament from 2011 to 2015 and was later the mayor of Hudson, Quebec.

Born in Montreal and raised in Hudson, Nicholls attended both St-Thomas elementary and Hudson High School. He became a New Democrat while enrolled at Malaspina College (now Vancouver Island University) in Nanaimo, BC at the age of 18. He graduated from the University of Victoria with a Bachelor of Fine Arts in Visual Arts in 1995. During that period, he was an outspoken social and environmental activist in Victoria, BC.

Upon graduating, Nicholls lived and taught in South Korea and Turkey. He was a lecturer in Visual Communication Design in the Faculty of Communications at Istanbul's Bahcesehir University until 2003. He returned to Canada to pursue a graduate degree in landscape architecture from the School of Architecture and Landscape Architecture at the University of British Columbia. Graduating in 2007, he returned to Quebec to work as a landscape architect.

Nicholls is a former Member of Parliament in Canada's 41st parliament. He was elected to represent Vaudreuil-Soulanges in the House of Commons of Canada in the 2011 election. On June 20, 2011 Jack Layton appointed him to serve as the Vice-Chair for standing committee on Transport, Infrastructure and Communities for the official opposition. In 2015, he was appointed Vice-Chair for the standing committee on Official Languages. He was defeated in the 2015 Red Tide election by Liberal Peter Schiefke.

In November 2017, Nicholls was elected mayor of Hudson, Quebec. He lost in the 2021 municipal election.

He lives in Hudson with his wife Amanda MacDonald and their five children.

Life and career

After studying and working in Vancouver, South Korea, and Turkey, he returned to Quebec permanently in 2007. Before his election to Parliament, Nicholls worked in a variety of fields: arts and design teacher, environmental researcher, ecological intervention adviser, registered landscape architect (AAPQ) and was a board member of COBAVER (Conseil des bassins versants Vaudreuil-Soulanges).

To win his seat in the House of Commons, Nicholls defeated incumbent Bloc Québécois MP Meili Faille.  He and Faille were friends in high school.

Working as a landscape architect while he was enrolled at McGill University's School of Urban Planning, Nicholls was one of five current McGill students, alongside undergraduates Mylène Freeman, Matthew Dubé, Charmaine Borg and Laurin Liu, elected to Parliament in the 2011 election following the NDP's unexpected mid-campaign surge in Quebec.

Following his defeat in the 2015 election, Nicholls ran for mayor of Hudson in Quebec's 2017 municipal elections, and won the election.

Electoral history

References

1971 births
Anglophone Quebec people
Members of the House of Commons of Canada from Quebec
New Democratic Party MPs
McGill University alumni
Living people
Politicians from Montreal
21st-century Canadian politicians
Mayors of places in Quebec